Vågsøy is an island in Kinn Municipality in Vestland county, Norway. The  island lies on the northern side of the mouth of the Nordfjorden, the sixth longest fjord in Norway. The Stadlandet peninsula lies to the north of the island, the islands of Silda and Barmøya and the mainland lie to the east of the island, the island of Husevågøy lies to the south (in the middle of the mouth of the Nordfjorden), and the open ocean lies to the west. Since the island lies along the open ocean, which can be rough, there are several lighthouses along the coastline of the island including: Hendanes Lighthouse, Kråkenes Lighthouse, and Skongenes Lighthouse.

The island is connected to the mainland by the Måløy Bridge.  The main population centre on the island is the town of Måløy, which is also the administrative centre for the municipality.  Other population centres are the villages of Raudeberg, Kvalheim, Langenes, Refvik, Vågsvåg, and Vedvik.  The population (2001) of the whole island was 4,207.  There are 2 churches on the island: Nord-Vågsøy Church in Raudeberg and Sør-Vågsøy Church in Måløy.

Media gallery

See also
List of islands of Norway
Operation Archery: British WWII commando raid against German positions on the island on 27 December 1941.

References

Islands of Vestland
Kinn